Thoondil is a 2008 Tamil language romantic drama film written and directed by K. S. Adhiyaman. The film stars Shaam, Sandhya, and Divya Spandana, while Vivek and Revathi play supporting roles. The music was composed by Abhishek Ray with editing done by V. M. Udhayashankar and cinematography by T. Kaviyarasu. The film released on 22 February 2008 and was opened to poor reviews.

Plot
The film tries to work on the old saying "hell hath no fury like a woman scorned". Divya (Divya Spandana) is an upcoming model in London who meets Sriram (Shaam), an IT guy, and falls in love. They sleep together, but Sriram leaves her when Divya's boss tells him to stay out of her life if he wants to see her make it big. Divya feels betrayed when she finds out but does not know that her boss is the reason behind the split. Divya does achieve her dream and becomes a top model but is on a revenge romp to wreak havoc in Sriram's happily married life to Anjali (Sandhya). Anjali is a cheerful girl whose only sorrow in life is that she does not have a child, and when she finally has a baby after four years of marriage to Sriram, Divya comes into her life and takes the baby away, saying that it is her baby. What happens after that forms the climax of the movie.

Cast
R. Sham as Sriram
Sandhya as Anjali
Divya Spandana as Divya
Vivek as Mac
Revathi as Dr. Jayanthi
R. K. as Mr Zoom
T. Siva as Mac's assistant
Iona as Mac's girlfriend

Production 
The film was shot extensively in London. Shaam, Sandhya and Divya were cast in the lead. Vivek was signed to play a comical role. Abhishek Ray composed the songs for this film.

Soundtrack
Soundtrack was composed by Abhishek Ray.
"Adhuva Ithu" - Naveen, Pop Shalini
"Kadhal Kadavulai" - Abhishek Ray, Sunidhi Chauhan
"Ratham Sindatha" - Sunidhi Chauhan
"Time is Now" - Pop Shalini
"Uyir Vazhvadhe" - Shreya Ghoshal

Critical reception
A critic from The Hindu noted that "Generally in a story of thrill and supsence, you would expect verve and vibrancy. But in 'Thoondil' things take their own sweet time to move - hence the momentum is missing". A critic from Rediff.com wrote "All in all, a supposedly suspense-filled love story that is anything but".  A critic from Sify wrote "The basic problem with the film is that the story is clichéd, unimaginative and amateurish to say the least. The presentation is old fashioned and the dialogues are banal."

References

External links

2008 drama films
Films scored by Abhishek Ray
2008 films
2000s Tamil-language films
Films directed by K. S. Adhiyaman